Gorraki is a village in Haripur district in Khyber Pakhtunkhwa, Pakistan. Gorraki is the main hub for nearby Bandaa (small villages). Sub divisions include Jarral Awan and Kutab Shahi Awan.

Residents regularly face a water shortage.

Education 
Gorraki has two primary schools - one for boys and one for girls.

Demographics
The majority of the villagers belong to the caste "Awan".

Most of the residents have migrated to Haripur.

References

Populated places in Haripur District